Michael Gaughan may refer to:
 Michael Gaughan (businessman) (born 1943), American businessman, race car driver, race car owner and casino operator
 Michael Gaughan (Irish republican) (1949–1974), Irish republican who died on hunger strike in England